Nemesio Rivera Meza (11 August 1918 – 9 January 2007) was a Peruvian Roman Catholic bishop.

Rivera Meza was born in Peru and was ordained to the priesthood in 1946. He served as Bishop of Huacho from 1958 to 1960 and as Bishop of Cajamarca from 1960 to 1961. He held the title of  Titular Bishop of Diospolis Superior  from 1961 until his death in 2007.

Notes

1918 births
2007 deaths
20th-century Roman Catholic bishops in Peru
Roman Catholic bishops of Huacho
Roman Catholic bishops of Cajamarca